Gettis is a surname. Notable people with the surname include:

Adam Gettis (born 1988), American football player, cousin of David
Byron Gettis (born 1980), American baseball player
David Gettis (born 1987), American football player
James Gettis (1816–1867), American lawyer and judge